Leucopogon hispidus is a species of flowering plant in the heath family Ericaceae and is endemic to the south-west of Western Australia. It was first formally described in 1904 by Ernst Georg Pritzel in Botanische Jahrbücher für Systematik, Pflanzengeschichte und Pflanzengeographie from specimens collected near Mingenew. The specific epithet (hispidus) means "with prickly hairs", referring to the leaves.

Leucopogon hispidus occurs in the Avon Wheatbelt and Geraldton Sandplains bioregions of south-western Western Australia and is listed under the name Styphelia hispida as "not threatened", by the Government of Western Australia Department of Biodiversity, Conservation and Attractions.

References

hispidus
Ericales of Australia
Flora of Western Australia
Plants described in 1904
Taxa named by Ernst Pritzel